Thurston railway station serves the village of Thurston in Suffolk, England.  The station, and all trains serving it, are operated by Greater Anglia.

It is served primarily by local services between Ipswich and Cambridge.

History
Thurston station was opened by the Ipswich and Bury Railway in 1846.  The main building was designed by Frederick Barnes in the Jacobean style using decorative brickwork.  The building required three stories to reach the platforms from ground level owing to the station's location on an embankment.  The building is Grade II listed and is no longer in railway use.  Adjacent to the station building is an original bridge over the road.

According to the Official Handbook of Stations the following classes of traffic were being handled at this station in 1956: G, P, F, L, H, C and there was a 1-ton 10 cwt crane. H Clarke & Son had a private siding.

An unusual accident

On 4 October 1850, two stationmasters were killed by striking an overhead bridge near the station, when riding on a carriage roof with their backs to the engine.

A boiler explosion

On 12 January 1944, whilst working a goods train from Ipswich to Whitemoor, the boiler of USATC S160 Class freight loco no. 2363 exploded at the station after the firebox crown became uncovered, injuring both driver and fireman.

Near-miss video
On 8 May 2010, the station made national news after a trainspotter, who was so engrossed in filming a steam locomotive special hauled by 70013 Oliver Cromwell, failed to notice the rapid approach of a Class 170 multiple unit travelling in the other direction. The near miss was caught on camera. After it went viral on the internet, he was dubbed by the railway press as a "vidiot" and drew widespread condemnation from rail enthusiasts and industry professionals.

Services
Greater Anglia operate hourly services to Cambridge and to Ipswich.

References

External links 

 Thurston station on navigable 1946 O.S. map

Railway stations in Great Britain opened in 1846
Railway stations in Suffolk
DfT Category F2 stations
Grade II listed railway stations
Former Great Eastern Railway stations
Greater Anglia franchise railway stations